Lancashire Witch was an early steam locomotive built by Robert Stephenson and Company in Newcastle-upon-Tyne in 1828.  It was a development of Locomotion.

Description
Lancashire Witch was an 0-4-0 locomotive with rear mounted cylinders inclined at 45 degrees driving to the front wheels. The rear wheels were powered via coupling rods. The boiler had two flue tubes and the locomotive burnt coke, aided by bellows on the tender. It was the first locomotive with steel springs. It was the first locomotive built by Robert Stephenson and Company.

History
The locomotive that was to become Lancashire Witch was ordered by the board of the Liverpool and Manchester Railway (L&MR) in January 1828. The boiler was to incorporate a series a small flues, this evolved into a large central flue and two smaller side flues bent at the end. Four months after the order the L&MR board transferred the order to the Bolton and Leigh Railway. Lancashire Witch was used on the Bolton and Leigh Railway (B&LR), which opened in June 1828, and also on the L&MR.

Postage stamps
Lancashire Witch appeared on two postage stamps issued by Funafuti-Tuvalu on 24 December 1984.

Other locomotives

London, Midland and Scottish Railway Royal Scot Class 4-6-0 locomotive 6125 was named Lancashire Witch in March 1928. Later that year an engraved brass plaque was added, depicting the original locomotive of 1828. The name and engraved plaque were removed in July 1935, and on 30 July 1936 a new name 3rd Carabinier was unveiled at a ceremony. The Royal Scot class loco was built by the North British Locomotive Company at Glasgow in September 1927 and withdrawn in October 1964 as 46125.

Class 86 locomotive 86 213 was named Lancashire Witch. This locomotive has been preserved in operational condition by the AC Locomotive Group.

References and notes

Bibliography

 

0-4-0 locomotives
Individual locomotives of Great Britain
Early steam locomotives
Steam locomotives of Great Britain
Liverpool and Manchester Railway locomotives
Robert Stephenson and Company locomotives
Standard gauge steam locomotives of Great Britain